HC Rys Podolsk was an ice hockey team in Podolsk, Russia. They played in the Vysshaya Liga, the second level of Russian ice hockey, from 2008-2010.

External links
Club profile on eurohockey.net

Ice hockey teams in Russia